This is a '''list of Bulgarian provinces and the capital city of Sofia by GDP

List of provinces by GDP 
Provinces by GDP in 2016 according to data by the OECD.

List of provinces by GDP per capita 
Provinces by GDP per capita in 2016 according to data by the OECD.

References 

Provinces by GDP
 GDP
Gross state product
Bulgaria